José Carlos Carrasco Távara (14 April 1944 – 16 January 2015) was a Peruvian lawyer and politician and a former Congressman representing the Piura region for the 2001–2006 term, and the 2006–2011 term. Carrasco belonged to the Peruvian Aprista Party. He was born in Sullana. He was the Minister of Energy and Mines during the First Presidency of Alan Garcia and was also a Deputy, representing the Piura region from 1980 to 1992, when President Alberto Fujimori shut the whole Congress down in a self-coup.

Biography 
He was born in the province of Sullana, on April 14, 1944.

He completed his school studies at the Colegio Santa Rosa de los Hermanos Maristas, in his hometown and his university studies at the Faculty of Law of the National University Federico Villarreal from 1965 to 1971, obtaining a Bachelor's Degree in Political Science and later graduating from attorney.

He was the Minister of Energy and Mines during the First Presidency of Alan Garcia and was also a Deputy, representing the Piura region from 1980 to 1992, when President Alberto Fujimori shut the whole Congress down in a self-coup. He returned to Congress, representing the Piura region for the 2001–2006 term, and the 2006–2011 term.  He participated in the 2014 regional elections as a candidate for the presidency of the Regional Government of Piura for the "Obras + Obras Regional Movement" without obtaining the election, remaining in eighth place with only 2,347% of the votes.

Death 
He died in Lima on 16 January 2015 from lung cancer, at the age of 70.

References

External links 

Official Congressional Site

1944 births
2015 deaths
American Popular Revolutionary Alliance politicians
Members of the Congress of the Republic of Peru
Deaths from cancer in Peru
Deaths from lung cancer

Federico Villarreal National University alumni
People from Piura Region